Sandra DesVignes-Millington (10 December 1957 – 28 January 2021), better known as Singing Sandra, was a Trinidadian calypsonian who won the Calypso Monarch title at the 1999 and 2003 carnivals.

Biography 
DesVignes-Millington was born in 1957 in East Dry River, and raised in Morvant, Trinidad and Tobago. She was born in a poor family and faced many hardships through her early teenage years. Singing Sandra never met her father and she was the only child of the family, but her singing talent was evident from an early stage, given that her grandmother was the best singer in her village in Tobago. She was baptized in a spiritual Baptist church when she was fifteen years old and during a later stage of her life she became a practising orisha.

From an early age, she sang and acted as a child, and performed a few small productions named 'Best Village' productions. She was rebellious and barely attended school because she was looking to work to make money. As a result, she worked in various low-income jobs and continued doing so till her twenties and Singing Sandra never finished school. Yet in her mid-20s she was approached in 1984 by calypsonian Dr Zhivago to perform two of his songs, and the following year was recruited to Mighty Sparrow's Youth Brigade tent at the carnival. Her exceptional talent and persistence in hard work and music resulted in her winning the National Calypso Queen in 1987. From that moment and after, her career accelerated at an exponential rate. She went on to win the Carifesta Monarch and Calypso Queen of the World titles in 1992 and she performed at the Reggae Sunsplash festival in 1992.

Later, she formed the group United Sisters along with Lady B, Tigress, and Marvellous Marva, yet she continued to perform as a solo artist and consequently won the 'Best Nation Building Song' award, along with a $5,000 prize, at the 1997 carnival for the song "One Destiny One Heart".

As a result of her career as an artist, she was a well-respected musician of soca. Her achievements were numerous. She was the second woman to win Trinidad's Calypso Monarch title, winning in 1999 with the songs "Song for Healing" and "Voices from the Ghetto".  She was able to finish in third place in 2000 and fifth place during 2001's festival. In 2003 she won the title for a second time, with "For Whom the Bell Tolls" and "Ancient Rhythm", winning a Honda Civic car and a $70,000 cash prize, becoming the first female calypsonian to win the title twice. She placed third in 2005 and second in 2006.

Calypso Monarch

1999 
In 1999, Singing Sandra became the second woman to ever win the Calypso Monarch competition after Calypso Rose's win in 1978.  This was an important feat because by being crowned the Calypso Monarch  at this annual Calypso competition that takes place at Trinidad and Tobago's Carnival, she was essentially reaffirming the place of women in Calypso music and society too, especially because Calypso, as a music genre, primarily focuses on lyrics full of social and political commentary. The two songs that put her in first place were titled "Song for Healing" and "Voices from the Ghetto", which are songs that speak on poverty and racism.  The socio-political topics of these songs, were thus very critical of social issues present in Trinidad and Tobago, today. Specifically "Voices from the Ghetto" speaks about all the hardships that come with growing up in a poor, crime-filled neighborhood, and was considered a very personal song because DesVignes-Millington herself grew up in the East Dry River area, which is known to be a very rough neighborhood.  Thus, competitions like the Calypso Monarch, are very important platforms for musicians that allow artists like Singing Sandra to be able to artistically voice their political experiences to both local and global audiences because many tourists from around the world flock to Trinidad and Tobago's Carnival celebrations each year.

2003 
Then again in 2003, Singing Sandra made history once more to become the only female Calypso artist to ever win the Calypso Monarch title twice.  This repeat win, now marked her legacy within Calypso music and also helped to again bring attention to the importance of female voices within a very male-dominated competition and genre. The two songs that Singing Sandra performed for this specific year's competition were also full of strong political ideas and were titled "For Whom the Bell Tolls?" and "Ancient Rhythm". The latter song relates to the specific experiences of the African diaspora community in Trinidad and other places, and also reflects how Singing Sandra finds her freedom within her music that help her embrace her diaspora identity. As prizes for these socially important songs Singing Sandra reportedly received a brand new Honda Civic along with a $70,000 cash prize.

Legacy 
Calypso artists communicate their thoughts and comments about the world, mainly, through their lyrics. Although the music is important, the words are crucial for a successful career. The topics vary from singer to singer and can contain any and every type of criticism, opinion, etc. As one of the pioneers in the Calypso industry, Singing Sandra's trajectory has empowered many listeners, especially women. She hoped to influence people positively by giving them something to think about. This is clearly, exemplified in one of her most famous songs, “Voices from the Ghetto.” This song speaks of the misery and pain circulating in a community, due to the effects that poverty has on its inhabitants. Recurring themes and messages such as this one, surround Singing Sandra's music. Another song that displays such beliefs, is “Sexy Employers,” which talks about sexual harassment in the workplace. As a result of the dissemination of these social, racial, and feminist ideas Singing Sandra has given Calypso a new face which has begun to pave the way for women in an industry made up predominantly by male figures. Her music has also crossed over other genres such as soca. The legacy of Singing Sandra is represented not only by the many awards she has received throughout her successful career but by also touching on topics that mainstream music rarely talks about. In conclusion, Singing Sandra can best be described as a role model and artistic socio-political figure.

Career
Born in East Dry River, and raised in Morvant, DesVignes sang and acted as a child, including performances in 'Best Village' productions. She left school at the age of fifteen, taking on a succession of low-paid jobs.

She was approached in 1984 by calypsonian Dr. Zhivago to perform two of his songs, and the following year was recruited to Mighty Sparrow's Youth Brigade tent at the carnival. She won the National Calypso Queen title in 1987. She went on to win the Carifesta Monarch and Calypso Queen of the World titles in 1992.

She performed at the Reggae Sunsplash festival in 1992, and subsequently formed the group United Sisters along with Lady B, Tigress, and Marvellous Marva. Sandra continued to perform as a solo artist and won the 'Best Nation Building Song' award, along with a $5,000 prize, at the 1997 carnival for the song "One Destiny One Heart".

Works

Sandra Des Vignes-Millington – more commonly known as Singing Sandra – stands as Calypso's biggest female icon thanks to her achievements in and contributions to an art form that was once dominated by men and machismo. Although it is challenging to state just one song as her most famous due to the nature of the progression of her music and popularity, it is certainly easier to say that she has indeed come a long way since her debut at Sparrow's Young Brigade tent in 1984.

While at Young Brigade, she earned both the local National Calypso Queen and St Maarten Queen of the World titles in 1987 with “Sexy Employees”, more popularly known as “Die with My Dignity”. The song mirrored Sandra's image and spiritually strong moral standing, and was an immediate hit with women in society who identified with the images of male chauvinism in the workplace. Sandra moved on to greater accomplishments and won the National Calypso Monarch in 1999 by singing her two megahits “Song for Healing” and her trademark rendition “Voices from the Ghetto”. She created history in what was definitely the year of the women. Another famous song of hers which was an immediate hit with the soca faithful is entitled “Lie Lie".

Therefore, even if one particular Singing Sandra song is difficult to claim as being the most famous, it is evident that she has numerous hits, each popular in their own respect due to the audiences they appealed to and the social dialogues they addressed. Simply stated, as her career advanced, the songs she released progressively gained fame along with her status and development as a musician.

References

External links
 
 

1957 births
2021 deaths
Calypsonians
20th-century Trinidad and Tobago women singers
20th-century Trinidad and Tobago singers
21st-century Trinidad and Tobago women singers
21st-century Trinidad and Tobago singers